Cléré-sur-Layon (literally Cléré on Layon) is a commune in the Maine-et-Loire department in western France.

Geography
The village lies on the right bank of the Layon, which flows northeastward through the commune.

See also
Communes of the Maine-et-Loire department

References

Cleresurlayon